The 2016–17 UNC Greensboro Spartans men's basketball team represented the University of North Carolina at Greensboro during the 2016–17 NCAA Division I men's basketball season. The Spartans, led by sixth-year head coach Wes Miller, played their home games at the Greensboro Coliseum, with two home games at Fleming Gymnasium, as members of the Southern Conference. They finished the season 25–10, 14–4 in SoCon play to finish in a three-way tie for the SoCon regular season championship. As the No. 1 seed in the SoCon tournament, they defeated The Citadel and Wofford to advance to the championship game where they lost to East Tennessee State. As a conference champion and No. 1 seed in their conference tournament who failed to win their conference tournament, they received an automatic bid to the National Invitation Tournament where they lost in the first round to Syracuse.

Previous season
The Spartans finished the 2015–16 season 15–19, 10–8 in SoCon play to finish in a tie for fifth place. They lost in the quarterfinals of the SoCon tournament to Furman. They were invited to the College Basketball Invitational where they defeated Houston Baptist in the first round before losing in the quarterfinals to Ohio.

Roster

Schedule and results

|-
!colspan=9 style=| Non-conference regular season

|-
!colspan=9 style=| SoCon regular season

|-
!colspan=9 style=| SoCon tournament

|-
!colspan=9 style=| NIT

References

UNC Greensboro Spartans men's basketball seasons
UNC Greensboro
UNC Greensboro
2016 in sports in North Carolina
2017 in sports in North Carolina